The 56th Observation Escadrille was a unit of the Polish Air Force at the beginning of the Second World War. The unit was attached to the Karpaty Army.

Air crew
Commanding officer: kpt. obs. Marian Sukniewicz.

Equipment
7 Lublin R-XIIID airplanes and 2 RWD-8.

See also
Polish Air Force order of battle in 1939

References
 

Polish Air Force escadrilles